Necrosis is a form of cell injury that results in the premature death of cells in living tissue.

Necrosis may also refer to:
 Necrosis (album), a 2004 album by the Norwegian death metal band Cadaver
 Necrosis (film), a 2009 independent film directed by Jason Robert Stephens
 Necrosis, a sublabel of Earache Records